Hexarthrum is a genus of true weevils in the beetle family Curculionidae. There are about 10 described species in Hexarthrum.

Species
These 10 species belong to the genus Hexarthrum:
 Hexarthrum brevipennis Voss, 1955
 Hexarthrum chaoi Zhang & Osella, 1995
 Hexarthrum chinensis Folwaczny, 1968
 Hexarthrum duplicatum Folwaczny, 1966
 Hexarthrum smreczynskii Folwaczny, 1966
 Hexarthrum thujae Brown, 1966
 Hexarthrum ulkei Horn, 1873 (eastern wood weevil)
 Hexarthrum usambaricum Voss, 1934
 Hexarthrum wushanensis Zhang & Osella, 1995
 Hexarthrum yunnanensis Zhang & Osella, 1995

References

Further reading

 
 
 

Cossoninae
Articles created by Qbugbot